Tin foil, also spelled tinfoil, is a thin foil made of tin. Tin foil was superseded after World War II by cheaper and more durable aluminium foil, which is still referred to as "tin foil" in many regions (an example of a misnomer).

History 

Foil made from a thin leaf of tin was commercially available before its aluminium counterpart. In the late 19th century and early 20th century, tin foil was in common use, and some people continue to refer to the new product by the name of the old one. Tin foil is stiffer than aluminium foil. It tends to give a slight tin taste to food wrapped in it, which is a major reason it has largely been replaced by aluminium and other materials for wrapping food.

Because of its corrosion resistance, oxidation resistance, availability, low cost, low toxicity, and slight malleability, tin foil was used as a filling for tooth cavities prior to the 20th century.

The first audio recordings on phonograph cylinders were made on tin foil.

See also 
 Tin foil hat
 List of common misnomers

References 

Tin
Metallic objects